Chwalibog may refer to:

 Chwalibogowice, a village in the Świętokrzyskie Voivodeship, Poland
 Chwalibogowo (disambiguation), a name of several villages in Poland,
 Chwalibożyce, a village in the Lower Silesian Voivodeship, Poland